Stenodema holsata is a species of bug from the family Miridae.

Description
These bugs have an elongate body and a coarsely pitted pronotum. The head shows a longitudinal small furrow. The first antennal segment has short hairs. The basic coloration before wintering is yellow-brown in females and dark brown in males, with brown longitudinal markings. In spring both sexes turn green, but the males remain darker.

Ecology
This species overwinter as an adult. In spring these bugs mate and larvae can be found from May toJuly. The new generation of adults appears from July onwards. Adults feed on Purple Moor-grass (Molinia caerulea).

Distribution
This species is widespread in most of Europe, up to Siberia, Asia Minor, Central Asia and China. It can be found throughout the United Kingdom, except for South East England.

Bibliography
Coulianos, C.-C. 1998. Annotated Catalogue of the Hemiptera-Heteroptera of Norway. Fauna Norv. Ser.B 45 (1-2), side 11-39
Gaun, Sven 1974. Blomsterteger (Miridae). Danmarks Fauna 81, 279
Frieder Sauer: Sauers Naturführer Wanzen und Zikaden nach Farbfotos erkannt. Fauna, Keltern 1996, .
Ekkehard Wachmann, Albert Melber, Jürgen Deckert: Wanzen. Band 2: Cimicomorpha: Microphysidae, Miridae. Goecke & Evers, Keltern 2006, .

References

Insects described in 1787
Hemiptera of Europe
Stenodemini